The New Year is the third studio album by indie rock band The New Year, released September 9, 2008 through Touch & Go Records.

Track listing

Personnel
Matt Kadane - guitar, vocals, production
Bubba Kadane - guitar, vocals, production
Peter Schmidt - guitar
Mike Donofrio - bass
Chris Brokaw - drums
Steve Albini - recording
Matthew Barnhart - additional recording
John Golden - mastering

References

External links
The New Year official website
 

2008 albums
The New Year albums
Touch and Go Records albums